Sûrtab S.A. is a Haitian technology company headquartered in Port-au-Prince, Haiti, that designs, develops, and sells computer hardware and consumer electronics, most notably, tablet computers.

Etymology
The name Sûrtab, is derived from a contraction between the French word, "sûr", which is used to designate things that are emphatic, certain, and true, that can not be questioned, must happen infallibly, and are reliable; with the English word "tablet".

See also
 Comparison of tablet computers

References

2013 establishments in Haiti
Companies based in Port-au-Prince
Computer companies established in 2013
Companies established in 2013
Computer hardware companies
Display technology companies
Electronics companies established in 2013
Haitian brands
Retail companies of Haiti
Tablet computers
Tablet computers introduced in 2013
Technology companies of Haiti
Touchscreen portable media players